Hot Metal Bridge is the official literary magazine for the University of Pittsburgh’s graduate Department of English.  Founded in 2001 as Nidus, Hot Metal Bridge publishes fiction, poetry, creative nonfiction, literary criticism, and book reviews. Hot Metal Bridge has an open submissions policy and strives to publish a combination of established writers along with unpublished or emerging talent.

In summer 2009, Hot Metal Bridge held the first annual Hot Metal Bridge Fiction Contest, judged by Tom Perrotta.

Notable contributors

 Russell Banks
 Charles Baxter
 Michael Byers
 Dan Chaon
 Maxine Hong Kingston
 Andrew Lam
 Don Lee
 Michael Martone
 Kevin Moffett
 Jesse Nathan
 Stewart O'Nan
 Tom Perrotta
 Michelle Wildgen

References

External links
Hot Metal Bridge 

2001 establishments in Pennsylvania
Literary magazines published in the United States
Book review magazines
Magazines established in 2001
Magazines published in Pittsburgh
University of Pittsburgh student publications